Sante Gaiardoni (born 29 June 1939) is a retired Italian cyclist. He won two gold medals at the 1960 Olympic Games in Rome, in the 1000 m time trial and the 1000 m sprint. Between 1958 and 1970 he won two gold, four silver and two bronze medals in sprint events at the UCI Track Cycling World Championships.

Biography
After retirement in 1971 he ran a bicycle shop in Lorenteggio, Milan. In the 2000s he was active in politics and took part in the 2006 Italian municipal elections. In 2010, together with journalist Francesco Lodi, he published a book Quando la Rabbia si trasforma in Vittoria ("When the anger turns into victory") describing his early life until 1960.

Awards
On 7 May 2015, in the presence of the President of Italian National Olympic Committee (CONI), Giovanni Malagò, was inaugurated in the Olympic Park of the Foro Italico in Rome, along Viale delle Olimpiadi, the Walk of Fame of Italian sport, consisting of 100 tiles that chronologically report names of the most representative athletes in the history of Italian sport. On each tile there is the name of the sportsman, the sport in which he distinguished himself and the symbol of CONI. One of the tiles is dedicated to Sante Gaiardoni.

See also
 Legends of Italian sport - Walk of Fame

References

External links
 
 Official website

1939 births
Living people
Cyclists from the Province of Verona
Italian male cyclists
Cyclists at the 1960 Summer Olympics
Olympic gold medalists for Italy
Olympic cyclists of Italy
Olympic medalists in cycling
Medalists at the 1960 Summer Olympics
UCI Track Cycling World Champions (men)
Italian track cyclists